The Museum of the Mountain West is a history museum off U.S. Route 50 in Montrose, Colorado.  It includes a collection of historic log cabins, Western town stores, and other historic buildings which have been moved to the site.

The museum was listed on the Colorado state register of historic properties in 2018.

The museum also owns a historic carriage shop, not on the same site, where eventual champion boxer Jack Dempsey trained.

See also
Montrose County Historical Museum
Ute Indian Museum

References

External links
Museum of the Mountain West, official site

History museums
Museums in Montrose County, Colorado
Montrose, Colorado